Durul Huda (June 1955 – 3 February 2020) was a Bangladeshi freedom fighter and  politician belonging to Jatiya Party. He was a member of the Jatiya Sangsad. He also served as the mayor of Rajshahi City Corporation.

Biography
Huda was born in 1955 at Mollatola in Shibganj of Chapai Nawabganj. He took part in the Liberation War of Bangladesh in 1971.

Huda was elected as a member of the Jatiya Sangsad from Rajshahi-1 in 1988. He served as the mayor of  Rajshahi City Corporation from 16 April 1990 to 6 November 1990. His mayoral post was equivalent to the status of deputy minister. He also served as the chairman of Rajshahi Zilla Parishad.

Huda died on 3 February 2020 at Square Hospital in Dhaka at the age of 64.

References

1955 births
2020 deaths
People from Rajshahi District
People from Chapai Nawabganj district
4th Jatiya Sangsad members
Jatiya Party politicians
People of the Bangladesh Liberation War
Mayors of Rajshahi